Christin Guhr (born ) is a German female volleyball player. She was part of the Germany women's national volleyball team.

She participated at the 2003 Women's European Volleyball Championship, and at the 2005 FIVB Volleyball World Grand Prix.
On club level she played for Dresdner SC in 2005.

References

External links
 Profile at FIVB.org
 https://web.archive.org/web/20171021220914/http://www.cev.lu/Competition-Area/PlayerDetails.aspx?TeamID=5685&PlayerID=17143&ID=144

1982 births
Living people
German women's volleyball players
Place of birth missing (living people)